Daqiu may refer to:

Daqiu Village, Anping, Lianyuan, Loudi, Hunan
Daqiu Village, Jiuru, Pingtung, Taiwan
Daqiu Village, Lioujia District, Tainan, Taiwan
Daqiu Islet or Greater Qiu Islet, Wuqiu, Kinmen, Fujian, Republic of China (Taiwan)
Daqiu Island, Beigan Township, Lienchiang County (the Matsu Islands), Fujian, Republic of China (Taiwan)

People and fictional characters with the given name Daqiu include:
Li Daqiu (born 1953), Chinese politician
Xiao Daqiu (541–551), a descendant of Emperor Jianwen of Liang
Zhou Daqiu, character in the 2005 Singaporean television drama Portrait of Home